White phosphorus munitions are weapons that use one of the common allotropes of the chemical element phosphorus. White phosphorus is used in smoke, illumination, and incendiary munitions, and is commonly the burning element of tracer ammunition. Other common names for white phosphorus munitions include WP and the slang terms Willie Pete and Willie Peter, which are derived from William Peter, the World War II phonetic alphabet rendering of the letters WP. White phosphorus is pyrophoric (it is ignited by contact with air); burns fiercely; and can ignite cloth, fuel, ammunition, and other combustibles.

In addition to its offensive capabilities, white phosphorus is a highly efficient smoke-producing agent, reacting with air to produce an immediate blanket of phosphorus pentoxide vapour. Smoke-producing white phosphorus munitions are very common, particularly as smoke grenades for infantry, loaded in defensive grenade launchers on tanks and other armoured vehicles, and in the ammunition allotment for artillery and mortars. These create smoke screens to mask friendly forces' movement, position, infrared signatures, and shooting positions. They are often called smoke/marker rounds for their use in marking points of interest, such as a light mortar to designate a target for artillery spotters.

History

Early use

White phosphorus was used by Fenian (Irish nationalist) arsonists in the 19th century in a formulation that became known as "Fenian fire". The phosphorus would be in a solution of carbon disulfide; when the carbon disulfide evaporates, the phosphorus bursts into flames. The same formula was also used in arson in Australia.

World War I, the inter-war period and World War II

The British Army introduced the first factory-built white phosphorus grenades in late 1916 during the First World War. During the war, white phosphorus mortar bombs, shells, rockets, and grenades were used extensively by American, Commonwealth, and, to a lesser extent, Japanese forces, in both smoke-generating and antipersonnel roles. The Royal Air Force based in Iraq also used white phosphorus bombs in Anbar Province during the Iraqi revolt of 1920.

Among the many social groups protesting the war and conscription at the time, at least one, the Industrial Workers of the World in Australia, used Fenian fire.

In the interwar years, the US Army trained using white phosphorus, by artillery shell and air bombardment.

In 1940, when the German invasion of Great Britain seemed imminent, the phosphorus firm of Albright and Wilson suggested that the British government use a material similar to Fenian fire in several expedient incendiary weapons. The only one fielded was the Grenade, No. 76 or Special Incendiary Phosphorus grenade, which consisted of a glass bottle filled with a mixture similar to Fenian fire, plus some latex. It came in two versions, one with a red cap intended to be thrown by hand, and a slightly stronger bottle with a green cap, intended to be launched from the Northover projector, a crude  launcher using black powder as a propellant. These were improvised anti-tank weapons, hastily fielded in 1940 when the British were awaiting a potential German invasion after losing the bulk of their modern armaments in the Dunkirk evacuation.

At the start of the Normandy campaign, 20% of American 81 mm mortar ammunition consisted of M57 point-detonating bursting smoke rounds using WP filler. At least five American Medal of Honor citations mention their recipients using M15 white phosphorus hand grenades to clear enemy positions, and in the 1944 liberation of Cherbourg alone, a single US mortar battalion, the 87th, fired 11,899 white phosphorus rounds into the city. The US Army and Marines used M2 and M328 WP shells in  mortars. White phosphorus was widely used by Allied soldiers for breaking up German attacks and creating havoc among enemy troop concentrations during the latter part of the war.

US Sherman tanks carried the M64, a 75mm white phosphorus round intended for screening and artillery spotting, but tank crews found it useful against German tanks such as the Panther that their APC ammunition could not penetrate at long range. Smoke from rounds fired directly at German tanks would be used to blind them, allowing the Shermans to close to a range where their armour-piercing rounds were effective. In addition, due to the turret ventilation systems sucking in fumes, German crews would sometimes be forced to abandon their vehicle: this proved particularly effective against inexperienced crews who, on seeing smoke inside the turret, would assume their tank had caught fire. Smoke was also used for "silhouetting" enemy vehicles, with rounds dropped behind them to produce a better contrast for gunnery.

Later 20th century uses

White phosphorus munitions were used extensively by US forces in Vietnam and by Russian forces in the First Chechen War and Second Chechen War. White phosphorus grenades were used by the US in Vietnam to destroy Viet Cong tunnel complexes as they would burn up all oxygen and suffocate the enemy soldiers sheltering inside. British soldiers also made extensive use of white phosphorus grenades during the Falklands War to clear out Argentine positions as the peaty soil they were constructed on tended to lessen the impact of fragmentation grenades. According to GlobalSecurity.org, during the Battle of Grozny during the First Chechen War in Chechnya, every fourth or fifth Russian artillery or mortar shell fired was a smoke or white phosphorus shell.

Use by US forces in Iraq
In April 2004, during the First Battle of Fallujah, Darrin Mortenson of California's North County Times reported that US forces had used white phosphorus as an incendiary weapon while "never knowing what the targets were or what damage the resulting explosions caused". Embedded with the 2nd Battalion, 1st Marine Regiment, Mortenson described a Marine mortar team using a mixture of white phosphorus and high explosives to shell a cluster of buildings where Iraqi insurgents had been spotted throughout the week. In November 2004, during the Second Battle of Fallujah, Washington Post reporters embedded with Task Force 2-2, Regimental Combat Team 7 stated that they witnessed artillery guns firing white phosphorus projectiles, which "create a screen of fire that cannot be extinguished with water. Insurgents reported being attacked with a substance that melted their skin, a reaction consistent with white phosphorous burns." The same article also reported, "The corpses of the mujaheddin which we received were burned, and some corpses were melted." The March/April 2005 issue of an official Army publication called Field Artillery Magazine reported that "White phosphorus proved to be an effective and versatile munition and a potent psychological weapon against the insurgents in trench lines and spider holes. ... We fired 'shake and bake' missions at the insurgents using W.P. [white phosphorus] to flush them out and H.E. [high explosives] to take them out".

The documentary Fallujah, The Hidden Massacre, produced by RAI TV and released 8 November 2005, showed video and photos purporting to be of Fallujah combatants and also civilians, including women and children, who had died of burns caused by white phosphorus during the Second Battle of Fallujah. George Monbiot, a British writer for the Guardian, disputed these claims, stating that while he was not "qualified to determine someone's cause of death", there was no evidence that white phosphorus was used against civilians and that "we don't yet know" how the people shown in the documentary had died.

The US Embassy in Rome denied that US troops had used white phosphorus as a weapon. On 15 November 2005, the US ambassador to the UK, Robert H. Tuttle, wrote to The Independent also denying that the United States used white phosphorus as a weapon in Fallujah, but later that same day US Department of Defense spokesman Lieutenant Colonel Barry Venable confirmed to the BBC that US forces had used white phosphorus as an incendiary weapon there, in order to drive combatants out of dug-in positions. On 22 November 2005, the Iraqi government stated it would investigate the use of white phosphorus in the battle of Fallujah. On 30 November 2005, a BBC article included an image of WP being fired from helicopters in the air above Fallujah and quoted General Peter Pace that white phosphorus munitions were a "legitimate tool of the military" used to illuminate targets and create smokescreens, saying "It is not a chemical weapon. It is an incendiary. And it is well within the law of war to use those weapons as they're being used, for marking and for screening". The article wrote that "If it comes into contact with human skin, white phosphorus can ignite and burn down to the bone if it is not exhausted or extinguished." Professor Paul Rodgers from the University of Bradford department of Peace and conflict studies said that white phosphorus would probably fall into the category of chemical weapons if it was used directly against people. George Monbiot stated that he believed the firing of white phosphorus by US forces directly at the combatants in Fallujah "in order to exert the toxic effects of those munitions upon those combatants to flush them out so they could then be killed" was in contravention of the Chemical Weapons Convention and, therefore, a war crime.

Use by Israeli forces in Lebanon
During the 2006 Lebanon War, Israel said that it had used phosphorus shells "against military targets in open ground" in south Lebanon. Israel said that its use of these munitions was permitted under international conventions.
However, President of Lebanon Émile Lahoud said that phosphorus shells were used against civilians. The first Lebanese official complaint about the use of phosphorus came from Information Minister Ghazi Aridi.

Use by Israeli forces in Gaza 

In its early statements regarding the Gaza War of 2008–2009, the Israeli military denied using WP entirely, saying "The IDF acts only in accordance with what is permitted by international law and does not use white phosphorus." However, numerous reports from human rights groups during the war indicated that WP shells were being used by Israeli forces in populated areas.

On 5 January 2009, The Times of London reported that telltale smoke associated with white phosphorus had been seen in the vicinity of Israeli shelling. On 12 January, it was reported that more than 50 patients in Nasser Hospital were being treated for phosphorus burns.

On 15 January, the headquarters of the United Nations Relief and Works Agency in Gaza City was struck by submunitions from Israeli artillery shells, setting fire to pallets of relief materials and igniting several large fuel storage tanks. A UN spokesperson indicated that there were difficulties in extinguishing the fires, stating "You can't put it [white phosphorus] out with traditional methods such as fire extinguishers. You need sand but we do not have any sand in the compound." Senior Israeli defense officials maintain that the shelling was in response to Israeli military personnel being fired upon by Hamas fighters who were in proximity to the UN headquarters, and was used for smoke. The soldiers who ordered the attack were later reprimanded for violating the IDF rules of engagement. The IDF further investigated improper use of WP in the conflict, particularly in one incident in which 20 WP shells were fired in a built-up area of Beit Lahiya.

After the Israel Defense Forces had officially denied for months having used white phosphorus during the war, the Israeli government released a report in July 2009 that confirmed that the IDF had used white phosphorus in both exploding munitions and smoke projectiles. The report argues that the use of these munitions was limited to unpopulated areas for marking and signaling and not as an anti-personnel weapon. The Israeli government report further stated that smoke screening projectiles were the majority of the munitions containing white phosphorus employed by the IDF and that these were very effective in that role. The report states that at no time did IDF forces have the objective of inflicting any harm on the civilian population.

Head of the UN Fact Finding Mission Justice Richard Goldstone presented the report of the Mission to the Human Rights Council in Geneva on 29 September 2009. The Goldstone report accepted that white phosphorus is not illegal under international law but did find that the Israelis were "systematically reckless in determining its use in built-up areas". It also called for serious consideration to be given to the banning of its use in built-up areas. The Government of Israel issued an initial response rejecting the findings of the Goldstone report.

The 155mm WP artillery shells used by Israel are typically the American M825A1, a base-ejection shell which deploys an airbursting submunition canister. These submunitions typically land in an elliptical pattern 125–250 meters in diameter, with the size of the effect area depending on the burst height, and produce a smokescreen 10 metres in height.

Afghanistan (2009)
There are confirmed cases of white phosphorus burns on bodies of civilians wounded during US–Taliban clashes near Bagram. The United States has accused Taliban militants of using white phosphorus weapons illegally on at least 44 occasions. On the other hand, in May 2009, Colonel Gregory Julian, a spokesman for General David McKiernan, the overall commander of US and NATO forces in Afghanistan, confirmed that Western military forces in Afghanistan use white phosphorus in order to illuminate targets or as an incendiary to destroy bunkers and enemy equipment. The Afghan government later launched an investigation into the use of white phosphorus munitions.

2016 Nagorno-Karabakh conflict 
After the 2016 Nagorno-Karabakh conflict over disputed territory of Nagorno-Karabakh, Azerbaijani Ministry of Foreign Affairs stated that on 10 May of that year the Armenian military had fired 122mm white phosphorus artillery munitions against Azerbaijani territory. On 11 May, Azerbaijan's Defense Ministry jointly with the Foreign Ministry invited military attaches from 13 countries to visit the territory in the Askipara village where the Defense Ministry said they had found a white phosphorus munition fired by Armenian forces. The use of phosphorus munition by the Armenian military was also reported by Al Jazeera. The Azerbaijani Military Prosecutor's Office initiated a criminal case upon the finding. NKR foreign ministry and Armenia defence ministry dismiss it as a falsification and distortion of the reality. Armenian media sources disclaimed it as a staged operation by Azerbaijan, citing absence of evidence of the presence of a shell or of a shell being used by Armenians, adding that this was a non-story as there was no evidence of any use.

Syrian Civil War
The Syrian government, the United States the Russian Federation and Turkey reportedly deployed white phosphorus munitions via airstrikes and artillery on different occasions during the Syrian Civil War.

Second Nagorno-Karabakh War 

During the Second Nagorno-Karabakh War, on 31 October 2020 the Ministry of Defence of the unrecognised Republic of Artsakh stated that the Azerbaijani side had used phosphorus weapons to burn forests near Shusha (Shushi). The next day, Armenia's human rights defender, Arman Tatoyan, stated that civilians were hiding in the forest. Atlantic Council's Digital Forensic Research Lab (DFRLab) found that "large burnt fields resembling burn damage from white phosphorus, or a very chemically similar material, were identified in Armenian-controlled territory." On 22 September 2021, the U.S. House of Representatives passed an amendment, calling for a report on Azerbaijani war crimes during war, including the use of white phosphorus against Armenian civilians.

The Azerbaijani authorities, in turn, accused the Armenian forces of using white phosphorus on civilian areas. Then, on 4 November, Azerbaijan National Agency for Mine Action (ANAMA) found unexploded white phosphorus munitions in Səhləbad, near Tartar, which, according to Azerbaijan, was fired by the Armenian forces. Azerbaijani authorities had also stated that the Armenian forces were transporting white phosphorus into the region. On 20 November, the Prosecutor General's Office of Azerbaijan filed a lawsuit, accusing the Armenian Armed Forces of using phosphorus ammunition in Nagorno-Karabakh, as well as in Tartar District.

Russo-Ukrainian war (2014-present)

Regulation and application
Incendiary ammunition is prohibited by the Geneva Convention, the provisions of which are binding on all countries involved in military conflicts. But because white phosphorus has legal uses, shells filled with it are not directly prohibited by international humanitarian law. Experts consider them not as incendiary, but as masking, since their main goal is to create a smoke screen.

White phosphorus ignites when interacting with oxygen, releasing a large amount of smoke during combustion. The military can use the curtain to mask troop movements. However, the chemical characteristics of the substance make phosphorus bombs especially dangerous: the burning temperature of phosphorus is 800–2500 °C; it sticks to various surfaces, including skin and clothes; the burning substance is difficult to extinguish. White phosphorus can cause deep burns down to the bones, and remnants of the substance in the tissues can ignite again after the initial treatment. It is difficult for military doctors, who are usually limited by medical resources, to provide timely and full assistance to the victims. Even burn survivors can die from organ failure due to the toxicity of white phosphorus. In addition, fires caused by incendiary projectiles can destroy civilian buildings and property, and damage crops and livestock. Humanitarian organizations such as Human Rights Watch are calling on governments to include phosphorus warheads under the UN Convention on Certain Conventional Weapons.

Despite the danger, for 2022 the Chemical Weapons Convention did not classify phosphorus bombs as such. Non-governmental international organizations have recorded their use during military conflicts in Syria, Afghanistan, the Gaza Strip, and other war zones. However, the use of phosphorus bombs near populated areas or civilians is still a war crime, as humanitarian law requires military attacks to be selective. The command is obliged to distinguish between civilians and soldiers, as well as civilian and military objects, which is impossible when using such projectiles in populated areas.

International law 
While in general white phosphorus is an industrial chemical not subject to restriction, certain uses in weaponry are banned or restricted by general international laws: in particular, those related to incendiary devices.

Article 1 of Protocol III of the Convention on Certain Conventional Weapons defines an incendiary weapon as "any weapon or munition which is primarily designed to set fire to objects or to cause burn injury to persons through the action of flame, heat, or combination thereof, produced by a chemical reaction of a substance delivered on the target". Article 2 of the same protocol prohibits the deliberate use of incendiary weapons against civilian targets (already forbidden by the Geneva Conventions), the use of air-delivered incendiary weapons against military targets in civilian areas, and the general use of other types of incendiary weapons against military targets located within "concentrations of civilians" without taking all possible means to minimise casualties.

The convention also exempts certain categories of munitions from its definition of incendiary weapons: specifically, these are munitions which "may have incidental incendiary effects, such as illuminants, tracers, smoke or signalling systems" and those "designed to combine penetration, blast or fragmentation effects with an additional incendiary effect."

The use of incendiary and other flame weapons against matériel, including enemy military personnel, is not directly forbidden by any treaty. The United States Military mandates that incendiary weapons, where deployed, not be used "in such a way as to cause unnecessary suffering." The term "unnecessary suffering" is defined through use of a proportionality test, comparing the anticipated military advantage of the weapon's use to the amount of suffering potentially caused.

The Chemical Weapons Convention, sometimes invoked in discussions of WP usage, is meant to prohibit weapons that are "dependent on the use of the toxic properties of chemicals as a method of warfare" (Article II, Definitions, 9, "Purposes not Prohibited" c.). The convention defines a "toxic chemical" as a substance "which through its chemical action on life processes can cause death, temporary incapacitation or permanent harm to humans or animals" (CWC, II). An annex lists chemicals that are restricted under the convention, and WP is not listed in the Schedules of chemical weapons or precursors.

In a 2005 interview with RAI, Peter Kaiser, spokesman for the Organisation for the Prohibition of Chemical Weapons (an organisation overseeing the CWC and reporting directly to the UN General Assembly), discussed cases where use of WP would potentially fall under the auspices of the CWC:

Smoke-screening properties
Weight-for-weight, phosphorus is the most effective smoke-screening agent known, for two reasons: first, it absorbs most of the screening mass from the surrounding atmosphere and secondly, the smoke particles are actually an aerosol, a mist of liquid droplets which are close to the ideal range of sizes for Mie scattering of visible light. This effect has been likened to three dimensional textured privacy glass—the smoke cloud does not obstruct an image, but thoroughly scrambles it. It also absorbs infrared radiation, allowing it to defeat thermal imaging systems.

When phosphorus burns in air, it first forms phosphorus pentoxide (which exists as tetraphosphorus decoxide except at very high temperatures):
 P4 + 5 O2 → P4O10
However phosphorus pentoxide is extremely hygroscopic and quickly absorbs even minute traces of moisture to form liquid droplets of phosphoric acid:
P4O10 + 6 H2O → 4 H3PO4 (also forms polyphosphoric acids such as pyrophosphoric acid, H4P2O7)
Since an atom of phosphorus has an atomic mass of 31 but a molecule of phosphoric acid has a molecular mass of 98, the cloud is already 68% by mass derived from the atmosphere (i.e., 3.2 kilograms of smoke for every kilogram of WP); however, it may absorb more because phosphoric acid and its variants are hygroscopic. Given time, the droplets will continue to absorb more water, growing larger and more dilute until they reach equilibrium with the local water vapour pressure. In practice, the droplets quickly reach a range of sizes suitable for scattering visible light and then start to dissipate from wind or convection.

Because of the great weight efficiency of WP smoke, it is particularly suited for applications where weight is highly restricted, such as hand grenades and mortar bombs. An additional advantage for hand smoke grenades—which are more likely to be used in an emergency—is that the WP smoke clouds form in a fraction of a second. Because WP is also pyrophoric, most munitions of this type have a simple burster charge to split open the casing and spray fragments of WP through the air, where they ignite spontaneously and leave a trail of rapidly thickening smoke behind each particle. The appearance of this cloud forming is easily recognised; one sees a shower of burning particles spraying outward, followed closely by distinctive streamers of white smoke, which rapidly coalesce into a fluffy, very pure white cloud (unless illuminated by a coloured light source).

Various disadvantages of WP are discussed below, but one which is particular to smoke-screening is "pillaring". Because the WP smoke is formed from fairly hot combustion, the gasses in the cloud are hot, and tend to rise. Consequently, the smoke screen tends to rise off the ground relatively quickly and form aerial "pillars" of smoke which are of little use for screening. Tactically this may be counteracted by using WP to get a screen quickly, but then following up with emission type screening agents for a more persistent screen. Some countries have begun using red phosphorus instead. Red phosphorus ("RP") burns cooler than WP and eliminates a few other disadvantages as well, but offers exactly the same weight efficiency. Other approaches include WP soaked felt pads (which also burn more slowly, and pose a reduced risk of incendiarism) and PWP, or plasticised white phosphorus.

Physiological effects

In addition to direct injuries caused by fragments of their casings, white phosphorus munitions can cause injuries in two main ways: burn injuries and vapour inhalation.

Burning

In munitions, white phosphorus burns readily with flames of 800 °C (1,472 °F). Incandescent particles from weapons using powdered white phosphorus as their payload produce extensive partial- and full-thickness burns, as will any attempt to handle burning submunitions without protective equipment. Phosphorus burns carry an increased risk of mortality due to the absorption of phosphorus into the body through the burned area with prolonged contact, which can result in liver, heart and kidney damage, and in some cases multiple organ failure. White phosphorus particles continue to burn until completely consumed or starved of oxygen. In the case of weapons using felt-impregnated submunitions, incomplete combustion may occur resulting in up to 15% of the WP content remaining unburned. Such submunitions can prove hazardous as they are capable of spontaneous re-ignition if crushed by personnel or vehicles. In some cases, injury is limited to areas of exposed skin because the smaller WP particles do not burn completely through personal clothing before being consumed.

Due to the pyrophoric nature of WP, penetrating injuries are immediately treated by smothering the wound using water, damp cloth or mud, isolating it from oxygen until fragments can be removed: military forces will typically do so using a bayonet or knife where able. Bicarbonate solution is applied to the wound to neutralise any build-up of phosphoric acid, followed by removal of any remaining visible fragments: these are easily observed as they are luminescent in dark surroundings. Surgical debridement around the wound is used to avoid fragments too small to detect causing later systemic failure, with further treatment proceeding as with a thermal burn.

Smoke inhalation 
Burning white phosphorus produces a hot, dense, white smoke consisting mostly of phosphorus pentoxide in aerosol form. Field concentrations are usually harmless, but at high concentrations the smoke can cause temporary irritation to the eyes, mucous membranes of the nose, and respiratory tract. The smoke is more dangerous in enclosed spaces, where it can cause asphyxiation and permanent respiratory damage. The US Agency for Toxic Substances and Disease Registry has set an acute inhalation Minimum Risk Level (MRL) for white phosphorus smoke of 0.02 mg/m3, the same as fuel-oil fumes. By contrast, the chemical weapon mustard gas is 30 times more potent: 0.0007 mg/m3. The agency cautioned that studies used to determine the MRL were based on extrapolations from animal testing and may not accurately reflect the health risk to humans. There are  no documented instances of fatalities from smoke inhalation alone under combat conditions.

See also
 Mark 77 bomb
 White phosphorus

References

Further reading

External links
 The Legality of the Use of White Phosphorus by the United States Military During the 2004 Fallujah Assaults (Roman Reyhani)
 Globalsecurity.org on WP (including use during the Battle of Fallujah and during the December 1994 battle for Grozny during the First Chechen War)

Incendiary weapons
 
Articles containing video clips